The 1994 Trans America Athletic Conference baseball tournament was held at Claude Smith Field on the campus of Mercer University in Macon, Georgia. This was the sixteenth tournament championship held by the Trans America Athletic Conference, in its sixteenth year of existence.  won their second tournament championship and earned the conference's automatic bid to the 1994 NCAA Division I baseball tournament.

Format and seeding 
The top two finishers from each division by conference winning percentage qualified for the tournament, with the top seed from one division playing the second seed from the opposite in the first round. Florida Atlantic was not eligible and did not play games that counted in the conference standings as it was their first year in the league.

Bracket

All-Tournament Team 
The following players were named to the All-Tournament Team.

Most Valuable Player 
Dan Newman was named Tournament Most Valuable Player. Newman was a second baseman for Southeastern Louisiana.

References 

Tournament
ASUN Conference Baseball Tournament
Trans America Athletic Conference baseball tournament